Browhaus is a Singaporean eye brow and eye lash grooming beauty chain with outlets worldwide.

The name is a play on the German art movement, Bauhaus. 

Browhaus was founded in Singapore in 2004, and as of 2022, has 33 eyebrow and eyelash grooming outlets in seven cities: Singapore, Shanghai, Hong Kong, Manila, Davao, Jakarta and Bangkok.

Browhaus offers services like "Brow Resurrection", using tattoo-like brow embroidery to create the illusion of larger eyebrows  and "Lash in Bloom" eyelash extensions. Browhaus also produces its own range of beauty products including "Browhaus Extend Lash & Brow Serum".

References

External links

Retail companies established in 2004
Retail companies of Singapore